Thang Luu is a Vietnamese American professional poker player who won the 2008 World Series of Poker $1,500 Omaha Hi-Low Split-8 or Better event and repeated as champion in the same event at the 2009 World Series of Poker. He finished runner-up in the same event at the 2007 World Series of Poker.

As of 2008, his total live tournament winnings exceed $750,000.

World Series of Poker 
Luu has five cashes at the World Series of Poker (WSOP) including finishing runner-up to Frankie O'Dell at the 2007 World Series of Poker $2,000 Omaha Hi-Low Split-8 or Better event.

In June 2008, Luu won his first World Series of Poker bracelet in the $1,500 Omaha Hi-Low Split-8 or Better event at the 2008 World Series of Poker, earning $243,342. He collected his second bracelet by winning the same event again at the 2009 World Series of Poker, earning $263,135.

World Series of Poker bracelets

Notes

Year of birth missing (living people)
American poker players
Living people
World Series of Poker bracelet winners
Vietnamese poker players